The 1999 Big West Conference men's basketball tournament was held March 9–11 at Lawlor Events Center in Reno, Nevada.

Utah State defeated  in the championship game, 71–66, to obtain the second Big West Conference men's basketball tournament championship in school history.

The Aggies participated in the 2000 NCAA Division I men's basketball tournament after earning the conference's automatic bid.

Format

The top eight teams were seeded based on regular season conference records.

Bracket

References

Big West Conference men's basketball tournament
Tournament
Big West Conference men's basketball tournament
Big West Conference men's basketball tournament